Restigouche-Chaleur is a provincial electoral district for the Legislative Assembly of New Brunswick, Canada. It is a redistribution of the riding of Nigadoo-Chaleur.

History and geography
Nigadoo-Chaleur was created in the 1973 electoral redistribution as one of the five districts from the previous Gloucester district, defined as the parish of Beresford and the villages in that area of Gloucester County.  It gained the remaining part of Belledune in Durham Parish from Restigouche East (which merged into Dalhousie-Restigouche East) and lost the area of parish of Beresford south of the Nigadoo River to Nepisiguit-Chaleur (now Nepisiguit) in the 1994 redistribution but did not change further in 2006. In the 2013 redistribution it lost Beresford to the new district of Bathurst West-Beresford but gained territory to its south running west of the Bathurst and Beresford municipal lines down to the Tetagouche river.

In its current form, it ranges from Belledune in the north, following the coast along the Nepisiguit Bay through the villages of Pointe-Verte, Petit-Rocher and Nigadoo to the boundary of Beresford, then turning south as far as the Tetagouche River

The riding is bordered by Bathurst West-Beresford to the south, Campbellton-Dalhousie and Restigouche West to the west, and Chaleur Bay to the northeast.

During the 53rd Legislative Assembly, Albert Doucet was removed from the Liberal cabinet on February 5, 1997 and then was removed from caucus in March of that year, due to comments criticizing NB Power, the Liberals' efforts to help Northern New Brunswick, and then Premier Frank McKenna's leadership. He sat as an independent until January 30, 1998 when he was accepted back into the Liberal fold.

Current Member of the Legislative Assembly

Roland Haché was MLA from 1999 until 2014, making him the most senior Liberal and tied with many Conservatives for second most senior MLA. Haché has announced he would not seek re-election in 2014. The current MLA for Restigouche-Chaleur is Daniel Guitard, elected in 2014, and re-elected in 2018.

Members of the Legislative Assembly
This riding has elected the following Members of Legislative Assembly:

Election results

Restigouche-Chaleur

Nigadoo-Chaleur

References

External links 
Website of the Legislative Assembly of New Brunswick

New Brunswick provincial electoral districts